A colt pixie (also colepixie, colepixy, collepixie, collpixie, colt-pixie, colt pixy, and cold pixie) is a creature from English folklore in the South and South West of England (especially the New Forest and Dorset). According to local mythology, it is a type of Pixie which takes the form of a scruffy, pale horse or pony to lead travellers and other livestock astray (similar to a Will-o'-the-wisp), and is often associated with Puck. The earliest surviving written reference dates to the early 16th century (I shall be ready at thine elbow to plaie the parte of Hobgoblin or Collepixie).

The phrase "as ragged as a colt pixie" was common in the New Forest at least as recently as the early 20th century. 
In the dialect of Dorset "to colt-pixy" meant to beat down the remaining apples after a crop has been harvested, i.e. to take the colts' horde.

Colloquial survivals
The fossil echini are called colt-pixies' heads
Cold Pixie's Cave is the name of a barrow in the New Forest, near Lyndhurst

References

English folklore
Hampshire folklore
New Forest folklore
Fairies
Horses in mythology
English legendary creatures
Pixies